Anjali Sharma (born 12 December 1956) is a former One Day International cricketer who represented India. She played three One Day Internationals. She took two wickets, with a best bowling of 1/32.

Sharma played in first class matches for Delhi State from 1975-1984, and was the captain for the 1983 National Tournament.

In June 2020, she was nominated to the Apex Council of the Delhi & District Cricket Association.  In November 2020, she became the chair of the Council's Player Welfare Committee for 2020-21.

References

Living people
India women One Day International cricketers
1956 births
Sportswomen from Delhi
Cricketers from Delhi
Indian women cricketers